() is an asteroid on an eccentric orbit, classified as near-Earth object and potentially hazardous asteroid of the Apollo group, approximately  in diameter. It was discovered on 20 August 2004 by the Siding Spring Survey at an apparent magnitude of 16.5 using the  Uppsala Southern Schmidt Telescope. It is one of the largest potentially hazardous asteroids known to exist.

Orbit and classification 

 orbits the Sun at a distance of 0.6–1.6 AU once every 14 months (412 days; semi-major axis of 1.08 AU). Its orbit has an eccentricity of 0.48 and an inclination of 37° with respect to the ecliptic. The body's observation arc begins with its official discovery observation at Siding Spring.

The object is a member of the Apollo asteroids, the largest subgroup of near-Earth asteroids which cross the orbit of Earth. Unlike many other members of this dynamical group,  is not a Mars-crosser, as its aphelion is too small to cross the orbit of the Red Planet at 1.66 AU.

Close approaches 

With an absolute magnitude of 14.7,  is one of the brightest potentially hazardous asteroids ever discovered (see PHA-list).

Sentry Risk Table 

Due to its originally estimated size of 5.5 kilometers,  was one of the largest objects to appear on the Sentry Risk Table. It was removed from the Sentry Risk Table on 25 August 2004.

Physical characteristics 

According to the survey carried out by the NEOWISE mission of NASA's Wide-field Infrared Survey Explorer,  has an albedo of 0.274, and it measures 2.914 and 3.320 kilometers in diameter, respectively.

As of 2018, no rotational lightcurve of  has been obtained from photometric observations. The body's rotation period, shape and spin axis remain unknown. In addition, the body's spectral type has never been assessed.

Numbering and naming 

This minor planet was numbered by the Minor Planet Center on 26 June 2006. As of 2018, it has not been named.

References

External links 
  at the European Asteroid Research Node, EARN
 Asteroid Lightcurve Database (LCDB), query form (info )
 
 
 

242450
242450
242450
242450
20040820